The 2021 Speedway Grand Prix season was the 27th season of the Speedway Grand Prix era, and decided the 76th FIM Speedway World Championship. The series was dominated by Polish venues once again with six of the 11 races taking place in Poland. Great Britain and Germany did not hold an event, however Russia was added to the calendar for the first time. In 2020, six of the eight races had been held in Poland.

Artem Laguta won his first world title. Laguta overtook defending champion Bartosz Zmarzlik in the points standings in round 10, which proved to be the pivotal moment of the championship.

Russian athletes competed as neutral competitors using the designation MFR (Motorcycle Federation of Russia), as the Court of Arbitration for Sport upheld a ban on Russia competing at World Championships. The ban was implemented by the World Anti-Doping Agency in response to state-sponsored doping program of Russian athletes.

Qualification 
For the 2021 season there were 15 permanent riders, who were joined at each Grand Prix by one wild card and two track reserves.

The top six riders from the 2020 championship qualified automatically. These riders were joined by the three riders who qualified via the Grand Prix Challenge and the winner of the 2020 Speedway European Championship.

The final four riders were nominated by series promoters, Benfield Sports International, following the completion of the 2020 season.

Qualified riders

Qualified substitutes 
The following riders were nominated as substitutes:

Calendar
The 2021 season consisted of 11 events.

Final Classification

References

External links 
 SpeedwayGP.com – Speedway World Championships

2021
Grand Prix